Plover may refer to:

Plover, Wisconsin, a village in Portage County
Plover, Portage County, Wisconsin, a town
Plover, Marathon County, Wisconsin, a town